Washington de Mesquista Ferreira or simply Washington (born May 19, 1986 in Rio de Janeiro), is a Brazilian striker. He currently plays for Botafogo.

Contract
3 January 2005 to 31 December 2009

External links
CBF

1986 births
Living people
Brazilian footballers
Botafogo de Futebol e Regatas players
Association football forwards
Footballers from Rio de Janeiro (city)